Rajpal Singh Baliyan is an Indian politician and member of the 18th Uttar Pradesh Assembly. Baliyan represented the Budhana (Assembly constituency) constituency of Uttar Pradesh and is a member of the Rashtriya Lok Dal.

Political career

Rajpal Baliyan was a close aide of farmer leader Mahendra Singh Tikait and senior leader of Bharatiya Kisan Union in his early days. He is honest and respected personality in Muzaffarnagar politics.

Rajpal Baliyan was first elected as MLA from the Khatauli Assembly constituency in 1996 with the support of the Bharatiya Kisan Union defeating incumbent minister Sudhir Kumar Baliyan of the Bharatiya Janata Party by 37,790 votes. He was re-elected from the same seat in the next election of 2002 defeating Pramod Tyagi of the Samajwadi Party by 28,171 votes.

In the 2007 election, he lost to Bahujan Samaj Party candidate Yograj Singh by nearly 16,000 votes. After 5 years in 2012, he again lost the election to Nawazish Alam Khan of the Samajwadi Party by 10,000 votes. In the 2017 election party chief Ajit Singh denied a ticket to him but he again got a ticket from the Budhana Assembly constituency in 2022. He won by huge margin this time defeating BJP's firebrand leader Umesh Malik by 28,310 votes.

References

1951 births
Living people
Uttar Pradesh MLAs 1997–2002
Uttar Pradesh MLAs 2002–2007
Uttar Pradesh MLAs 2022–2027